Barbara Mazzei is an Italian archaeologist known for the discovery of the earliest iconography of the Apostles.

Biography
Mazzei works in the Vatican's Pontifical Commission for Sacred Archaeology.

Research
The earliest images of St Paul were uncovered by a team led by Mazzei in 2009 in the catacomb of Santa Tecla (or Thekla). She was martyred at the beginning of the reign of Diocletian at the beginning of the fourth century.

In 2010, Mazzei's team discovered images depicting the apostles John, Paul, Andrew and Peter in the catacombs of Santa Tecla. These were dated to the fourth century, following the legalisation of Christianity in the Roman empire by Constantine. The images were on the vault of a tomb of a Roman noblewoman who converted to Christianity. Mazzei believes these images provided the standard for subsequent Christian iconography. These were also the earliest known depictions of Andrew and John. The images were uncovered by removing with a laser the calcium deposits that obscured them, the first time the technique was used in the catacombs.

Mazzei led a seven-year investigation and restoration of Rome's catacombs of St Domitilla, which uncovered frescoes dating to around AD 360. Using laser techniques similar to those at Santa Tecla, the team was able to penetrate the grime in order to reveal the frescoes, on the ceilings of two tombs of imperial grain merchants. The frescoes also depicted the transport of grain from around the Mediterranean to Ostia.

With the help of the lasers, each layer of smoke deposit, chalk and algae was stripped. By the use of multiple wavelength lasers and chromatic selection, the deposits were removed millimetre by millimetre. The team discovered the images of the merchants accompanied by two saints, possibly the martyrs Nereus and Achilleus from the time of Diocletian. This enabled the dating of the frescoes to the latter half of the fourth century.

Selected works

Articles

Books

References 

Italian archaeologists
Living people
Pontifical Commission of Sacred Archaeology
Year of birth missing (living people)
Italian women archaeologists